Warner Bros. Games (formerly Warner Bros. Interactive Entertainment) is an American video game publisher based in Burbank, California, and part of the Global Streaming and Interactive Entertainment unit of Warner Bros. Discovery (WBD). The published was founded as Warner Bros. Interactive Entertainment on January 14, 2004, under Warner Bros. Entertainment and transferred to its Home Entertainment division when that company was formed in October 2005. Warner Bros. Games manages the wholly owned game development studios TT Games, Rocksteady Studios, NetherRealm Studios, Monolith Productions, WB Games Boston, Avalanche Software, and WB Games Montréal, among others.

History 
The foundation of Warner Bros. Interactive Entertainment (WBIE) under Warner Bros. was announced on January 14, 2004, along with the WB Games (Warner Bros. Games) brand, under which WBIE would publish games. Jason Hall, previously of Monolith Productions, was named as its senior vice president. Later that year, Warner Bros. acquired Monolith Productions. In October 2005, Warner Bros. created a new group–Warner Bros. Home Entertainment–and WBIE was transferred as part of it.

The first game that Monolith developed in conjunction with Warner Bros. was The Matrix Online, which SEGA helped co-publish. Warner Bros. also helped distribute both Enter the Matrix and The Matrix: Path of Neo for the Matrix series. In 2006, they bought a 10.3% stake in SCi Entertainment, the owner of Eidos Interactive. That same year, they released their first self-published title (with no co-publishers), Justice League Heroes, which was distributed by Eidos on the Xbox. Also in 2006, British video game publisher Codemasters signed an American distribution deal with Warner Bros; the deal expired in 2011 when Codemasters left for THQ. In 2012, Codemasters and Warner Bros. restarted the distribution deal after THQ went bankrupt.

In 2007, they implemented a five-year plan, the goal of which was to expand in the video game industry and included the acquisition of studios for internal development and the creation of a studio (WB Games) in the Seattle area that will run all the games published and developed by the company; the first acquisition under this plan was Britain's TT Games that same year, for £100 million.

In April 2008, they increased their stake to 35%, gaining distribution rights of all Eidos games in North America. On December 15, 2008, shortly after SCi changed their name to Eidos plc, Warner acquired a total of 10 million shares of the company, raising its owned amount to 19.92%, after an agreement which prevented Time Warner from acquiring more shares was scrapped one month earlier. On January 28, 2009, The Hollywood Reporter reported the deal also gave Warner the rights of the Tomb Raider film series, previously owned by Paramount Pictures. On February 12, 2009, Warner Bros. backed Square Enix's acquisition offer worth £84.3 million for Eidos plc as majority stakeholder.

Warner Bros. announced on February 4, 2009 it had purchased independent developer Snowblind Studios. Terms of the deal were not disclosed, but the acquisition serves to strengthen the publisher's internal development effort. In 2009, Warner purchased most of the assets of American publisher Midway Games, operating under Chapter 11 bankruptcy protection, for $49 million. The assets purchased include Midway's studio in Chicago and Surreal Software, resulting in the ownership to the rights to the Joust, Mortal Kombat, The Suffering, Spy Hunter and Wheelman series. Midway had previously worked with Warner Bros. on several games, including Mortal Kombat vs. DC Universe. Midway intended to hold an auction of its assets on June 29, 2009, but no other bids were placed. In the process, Warner became the owner of the Blitz: The League series. On July 28, 2009, Midway's Mortal Kombat team was rebranded WB Games Chicago and, in 2010, was merged with Midway Games to form NetherRealm Studios.

On January 13, 2010, it was announced that WBIE would produce and gain exclusive rights to Sesame Street video games, starting in fall 2010 with Elmo's A-to-Zoo Adventure and Cookie's Counting Carnival. On February 23, 2010, Warner Bros. Home Entertainment Group announced it had acquired a majority stake in independent London-based developer Rocksteady Studios, an independent development studio based in London. Rocksteady and Warner had previously worked together in Batman: Arkham Asylum and Batman: Arkham City, and have announced they will work in the future with more Warner Bros. licenses.

On March 22, 2010, WBIE became the latest videogame company to open a studio in Quebec. Martin Tremblay was chosen to lead the new Montreal studio, WB Games Montréal. The studio gradually grow to include more than 300 people by the end of 2015. Tremblay also said that Warner would open another studio in another city soon. He also said that WB Games Montréal will focus on creating games based on the DC Comics license. On April 9, WBIE announced it would publish a third installment to the F.E.A.R. series in the fall of 2010. On April 20, 2010, Warner Bros. Home Entertainment Group acquired Turbine, Inc. the developer of the famous MMOs Asheron's Call, Dungeons & Dragons Online and The Lord of the Rings Online.

On June 4, WBHEG and Turbine, inc. said that the massively multiplayer online title The Lord of the Rings Online was to become a free-to-play game that autumn. WBIE announced 6 days later that Mortal Kombat, a reboot of the series (and considered the series' most brutal installment to date), was due for release on the PlayStation 3 and Xbox 360 in 2011. Mortal Kombat was developed by the newly renamed NetherRealm Studios, led by series creator and creative director Ed Boon. Branching out from Game Party for the Wii, WBIE attempted to leverage the Xbox 360's new full-body motion-sensing device Kinect on June 14 and revealed Game Party: In Motion for the new device, set for a November 4 release as a launch title. After Kevin Tsujihara became chairman and CEO of Warner Bros., he promoted Diane Nelson to the post of President and Chief Content Officer of Warner Bros. Interactive Entertainment. In January 2015, David Haddad was named Executive Vice President and General Manager of the company and was promoted to President in October.

On December 19, 2016, it was announced that Warner Bros. would no longer develop or publish The Lord of the Rings Online or Dungeons & Dragons Online; further development of the game would be handled by a newly formed studio, Standing Stone Games, with publishing to be transitioned over to Daybreak Game Company. The new studio would take the old development team from Turbine, leaving Turbine as a mobile-only developer. As part of the deal, Daybreak did not pick up the rights to Asheron's Call, an original IP created by Turbine and thus owned by Warner Bros. as part of the 2010 acquisition. This resulted in the closure of Asheron's Call and Asheron's Call 2: Fallen Kings on January 31, 2017.

On January 24, 2017, it was announced that recently-closed studio Avalanche Software and its Octane engine software were acquired by Warner Bros. from Disney Interactive Studios and the studio was reopened, with John Blackburn returning as its CEO. The studio's first title under Warner was a companion video game to the Disney-Pixar film Cars 3, titled Cars 3: Driven to Win, in partnership with Warner Bros., Disney, and Pixar. On February 8, Playdemic was acquired through TT Games to make Lego games for mobile devices. On July 11, 2018, it acquired Plexchat, a communications platform for mobile games, with its founder and staff joining WB Games San Francisco.

In mid-2020, there had been industry rumors that AT&T, as to raise funds, was looking to sell off parts of its divisions, with WBIE as one that had been rumored to be up for sale that would have raised $4 billion, according to CNBC and The Information; potential buyers had been rumored to include Take Two Interactive, Microsoft, Activision Blizzard and Electronic Arts. However, in an August 2020 press release regarding an organizational restructuring, WarnerMedia stated that WBIE "remains part of the Studios and Networks group". Bloomberg News reported AT&T has confirmed to no longer be selling the game division, the decision to keep the division amid a change in leadership at AT&T in July of that year.

As part of this sale, there were rumors that only portions of WBIE would be moved with the bulk of the other WarnerMedia properties, but WBIE will be retained under the new merged company, set to be named Warner Bros. Discovery. The Electronic Arts' acquisition of Playdemic was completed on September 20, 2021. It was announced on April 7, 2022, that Warner Bros. Games was reorganized with streaming services HBO Max and Discovery+ to form Warner Bros. Discovery Global Streaming & Interactive Entertainment, to be overseen by JB Perrette; WB Games president David Haddad would report directly to Perrette.

Subsidiaries and divisions

Publishing labels 
 Portkey Games, which was founded in 2017 as the publishing label for games set within the Wizarding World franchise.

Studios 
 Avalanche Software in Salt Lake City, Utah, founded in 1995, acquired by The Walt Disney Company in 2005, closed along with the former parent company of the studio, Disney Interactive Studios, in May 2016. Acquired by WBIE in January 2017, which reopened the studio.
 Monolith Productions in Kirkland, Washington, founded in 1994, acquired in 2004.
 NetherRealm Studios in Chicago, founded as Midway Games Chicago in 1988, acquired in 2009, and renamed in 2010.
 Rocksteady Studios in London, founded in 2004 and majority stake acquired in February 2010.
 TT Games in Knutsford, England, founded in 2005, acquired November 8, 2007.
 Traveller's Tales in Knutsford, England, founded in 1989, reorganized as the main development division of TT Games in 2005.
 TT Fusion in Wilmslow, England, founded in 2005 as Embryonic Studios, reorganized as a division of TT Games in 2007.
 TT Games Publishing, Bristol, England, founded in 2003 as Giant Interactive Entertainment, reorganized as a division of TT Games in 2005.
 TT Odyssey in Brighton, founded in January 2018 as TT Games Brighton, renamed in March 2018.
 WB Games Montréal in Montreal, founded in 2010.
 WB Games Boston in Needham, Massachusetts, founded in 1994, acquired in 2010.
 WB Games New York in Troy, New York, founded as Agora Games in 2005, acquired and renamed in 2017.
 WB Games San Diego in San Diego; founded in 2019.
 WB Games San Francisco in San Francisco, founded in 2013.

Former studios 
 Snowblind Studios in Kirkland, Washington, founded in 1997, acquired in 2009. Merged into Monolith Productions in 2012.
 Surreal Software in Kirkland, Washington, founded in 1995, acquired from Midway Games on July 27, 2009. Merged into Monolith Productions in 2010.
 Playdemic in Manchester, England, founded in 2010, acquired on February 8, 2017, sold to Electronic Arts in June 2021.

List of video games

See also 
 List of video games based on DC Comics
 List of Superman video games
 List of Batman video games
 Middle-earth in video games
 List of Looney Tunes video games
 List of Tiny Toon Adventures video games
 List of Tom and Jerry video games

References

External links 
 

 
2004 establishments in California
American companies established in 2004
Companies based in Burbank, California
Video game companies based in California
Video game companies established in 2004
Video game development companies
Video game publishers
Games